Negro es mi color is a 1951 Mexican musical film directed by Tito Davison.

Cast 
 Marga López - Luna / Blanca del Río
 Rita Montaner - Rita, madre de Luna
 Roberto Cañedo - Fernando Acuña
 José María Linares-Rivas - Don Álvaro, padre de Luna 
 Freddy Fernández - Freddy
 Los Panchos - Trio

References

External links 

1951 musical films
1951 films
Mexican musical films
Mexican black-and-white films
1950s Spanish-language films
1950s Mexican films